Arktos is a character from Greek mythology.

Arktos or Arctos may also refer to:

Arktos Media, a publishing company
Arctos (journal), a journal of the Classical Association of Finland
 Arktos, a solo Arctic Circle expedition by Mike Horn
Arktos, a 1993 book by Joscelyn Godwin
 Arktos, a character from the TV series Tabaluga

See also
 Arctic (disambiguation)